Aksel Herman Rüütli (16 July 1893 – 22 February 1976) was an Estonian politician born in Haaslava and representing the Estonian Socialist Workers' Party. He was a member of III Riigikogu. On 15 October 1926, he resigned his position and he was replaced by Mart Adamson.

References

1893 births
1976 deaths
Members of the Riigikogu, 1926–1929
Estonian Socialist Workers' Party politicians
People from Kastre Parish